"Refugee" is a song recorded by American rock band Tom Petty and the Heartbreakers, was released in January 1980 as the second single from their album Damn the Torpedoes, and peaking at No. 15 on the Billboard Hot 100 singles chart. The song is in compound AABA form.

Composition and recording
The song's co-writer Mike Campbell said "Refugee" was one of the first songs he wrote, and recounted, 'I just wrote the music and handed it to Tom [Petty] and he put the words over it, and when he did he found a way to make the chorus lift up without changing chords.'

In a November 2003 interview with Songfacts, Campbell described the recording sessions for "Refugee":

Billboard described "Refugee" as being "Petty at his best," specifically praising the "gutsy rock vocal and searing guitar lines."  Cash Box said it has "growing interplay between guitar and organ, coupled with Petty’s forceful vocals."  Record World called it a "perfect union of power and passion."

Reception
"Refugee" is widely regarded as one of Petty's best songs. In 2017, Billboard ranked the song number 10 on their list of the 20 greatest Tom Petty songs, and in 2020, Rolling Stone ranked the song number two on their list of the 50 greatest Tom Petty songs.

Personnel
Tom Petty – lead vocal, rhythm guitar
Mike Campbell – lead guitar
Ron Blair – bass
Stan Lynch – drums, backing vocal
Benmont Tench – organ, backing vocal
Jim Keltner - shaker

Notable remakes
"Refugee" was covered by Melissa Etheridge in 2005 for her album Greatest Hits: The Road Less Traveled, and reached No. 96 in the Billboard Pop 100 charts. Other versions have been recorded by Vains of Jenna, Alvin and the Chipmunks, and The Gaslight Anthem.

Chart performance

Weekly charts

Year-end charts

References

External links
 

1979 songs
1980 singles
Tom Petty songs
2005 singles
Melissa Etheridge songs
Songs written by Tom Petty
Songs written by Mike Campbell (musician)
Song recordings produced by Jimmy Iovine
Alvin and the Chipmunks songs